League table for teams participating in Ykkönen, the second tier of the Finnish Soccer League system, in 1995.

League table

Promotion play-offs
 KTP Kotka – MP Mikkeli 0–1
 MP Mikkeli – KTP Kotka 2–0

Mikkelin Palloilijat won 3-0 on aggregate and remained in the Veikkausliiga.

See also
Veikkausliiga (Tier 1)
1995 Finnish Cup

References

Ykkönen seasons
2
Finland
Finland